During the First World War, Ottoman Empire and United States sided in different sides, but they never officially declared war on each other. However, American ships carried weapons for the Entente during the Gallipoli campaign.

After the First World War, the Ottoman Empire was defeated and the Armistice of Mudros was signed. The Entente requested Istanbul, Marmara Region and Greater Armenia to be under control of an American mandate. Some Turkish communities even defended idea of whole Anatolia being controlled by United States.

United States reportedly helped the Entente during Turkish War of Independence. American aid included but wasn't limited to logistic support. USS Arizona and 3 other American ships provided protection to the Greeks during Greek landing at Smyrna. On 7 June 1922, Greek battleships (including Georgios Averof) and the American battleships USS Sands, USS McFarland and USS Sturtevant bombed Samsun to help the Greek rebels in region. 4 Turkish civilians were killed and 3 were injured as a result of bombardment. The bombardment also caused large scaled damage in city, destroying dozens of buildings.

List of Battleships 

Many American battleships served in Turkish territorial waters between 1908 and 1923. The most important ones can be listed as;

 USS Scorpion
 USS Alden (DD-211)
 USS Arizona (BB-39)
 USS Noma (SP-131)
 USS Martha Washington (ID-3019)
 USS Dyer (DD-84)
 USS Du Pont (DD-152)
 USS Whipple (DD-217)
 USS Roper (DD-147)
 USS Gregory (DD-82)
 USS Luce (DD-99)
 USS Manley (DD-74)
 USS Tattnall (DD-125)
 USS Humphreys (DD-236)
 USS Sands (DD-243)
 USS Sturtevant (DD-240)
 USS Fox (DD-234)
 USS McFarland (DD-237)
 USS Kane (DD-235)
 USS Hatfield (DD-231)
 USS Gilmer (DD-233)
 USS Hopkins (DD-249)
 USS Overton (DD-239)
 USS King (DD-242)
 USS Barry (DD-248)
 USS Goff (DD-247)
 USS Bainbridge (DD-246)
 USS Bridge

References

Citations

Sources 

 

Turkish War of Independence
Military history of the United States
United States in World War I
Foreign relations of the United States
1919 in the United States
1922 in the United States